Pauli Antero "Pate" Mustajärvi (born July 12, 1956) is a Finnish rock singer. He is known as the vocalist, frontman and only original member of Popeda as well as a solo artist. In his birthplace of Tampere he is known as "Ikurin turbiini" ("the turbine of Ikuri)."

Mustajärvi appears on the 1984 film Calamari Union by Aki Kaurismäki, playing one of the fifteen main characters named Frank.

In 2004 Mustajärvi performed two songs on the soundtrack of the Finnish action/thriller film Vares - yksityisetsivä. According to his label, Poko Rekords, Mustajärvi is set to release two cover albums in 2009, one featuring songs from his longtime friend Juice Leskinen, the other dedicated to translations of Johnny Cash songs into Finnish.

Discography

Albums
With Popeda
See: Popeda discography

Solo
1984: Nyt!
1988: Lago Nero
1995: Ikurin turbiini
1998: Vol. 4
2000: Ukkometso
2005: Ajan päivin, ajan öin
2009: Ollaan ihmisiksi 
2010: Musta
2013: Patentoitu
2015: Taivas on Täynnä
2016: 60 – Suurimmat Hitit 1983–2016

Singles
(Selective)
2005; "Ajan päivin, ajan öin"
2009: "Kaksoiselämää"

Filmography

References

External links
Official site
Pate Mustajärvi at the Internet Movie Database

1956 births
Living people
musicians from Tampere
Finnish male musicians